Brother Marcellus Haywood Luck IV (known professionally as Brother Luck) is an American chef, best known as the winner of Food Network's Beat Bobby Flay in 2016, a Chopped finalist, and a Top Chef season 15 and 16 contestant.

Early life and education 
Luck was born in San Francisco and spent time abroad with his parents. From the age 14, he started working in professional kitchens and because of that multiple culinary scholarships was awarded to luck during his high school through competition cooking organizations. 

Luck attended The Art Institute of Phoenix in Phoenix, Arizona after studying high school. Luck became a Certified Executive Chef through the American Culinary Federation.

Career 
Luck is the owner of the restaurant Brother Luck Street Eats, that is inspired by street food from around the world.

In 2017, Luck opened Four by Brother Luck in Downtown Colorado Springs focusing on the four providers behind his cooking; the hunters, fisherman, farmers and gatherers. 

Luck also owned the Lucky Dumplings in Colorado Springs. After Culinary School, Luck continued working in many fine dining kitchens around the world including Takitei and Kinjhoro Ryokans located in Kanazawa, Japan.

Awards 

 Best Local Chef by Colorado Springs Independent

 Most Cutting Edge Restaurant by The Gazette Newspaper and Colorado Springs Independent

 James Beard Best Chef Semi-finalist Mountain Region, 2020

 Essential Worker Award by the City of Colorado Springs, 2021

References 

American male chefs
Year of birth missing (living people)
People from San Francisco
Top Chef contestants
Food Network chefs
American television chefs
Living people